Lochis Madonna may refer to:
 Lochis Madonna (Bellini)
 Lochis Madonna (Crivelli)
 Lochis Madonna (Titian)